Tamás Buday (born July 5, 1952) is a Canadian sprint canoe coach and retired Hungarian sprint canoer. He competed in doubles at the 1976 and 1980 Olympics and won two bronze medals in 1976. He also won thirteen medals at the ICF Canoe Sprint World Championships with four gold (C-2 1000 m: 1978, C-2 10000 m: 1978, 1981, 1983), five silvers (C-1 1000 m: 1981, C-2 1000 m: 1977, 1979; C-2 10000 m: 1974, 1975), and four bronzes (C-1 1000 m: 1977, C-2 10000 m: 1973, 1979, 1982).

In 1987, Buday moved to Canada, after being invited to train the national canoeing team. He is a member of the Mississauga Sports Hall of Fame and recipient of the Canadian Coaching Excellence Award. His sons Attila and Tamás, Jr. competed in sprint canoe for Canada at three Olympics.

References

External links

1952 births
Canadian male canoeists
Canoeists at the 1976 Summer Olympics
Canoeists at the 1980 Summer Olympics
Hungarian male canoeists
Hungarian defectors
Living people
Olympic canoeists of Hungary
Olympic bronze medalists for Hungary
Olympic medalists in canoeing
Hungarian emigrants to Canada
ICF Canoe Sprint World Championships medalists in Canadian

Medalists at the 1976 Summer Olympics
Canoeists from Budapest